Gabrielle Aghion (née Hanoka; 3 March 1921 – 27 September 2014) was a French fashion designer and the founder of the French fashion house Chloé. She is said to have coined the phrase "prêt-à-porter".

Career
She was born in Alexandria, Egypt, the daughter of a cigarette factory manager. She met her husband, Raymond Aghion (1921–2009), when both were seven years old in elementary school. He was born into a wealthy family of cotton exporters, but displayed early stirrings of the social consciousness that would later land him in political exile. They were both Jewish and married at the age of 19, before moving to Paris in 1945. In Paris they gravitated toward the Communists, becoming close to writers Louis Aragon, Paul Éluard and Tristan Tzara.

Aghion launched Chloé in 1952. Raymond opened an art gallery in 1956, specializing in modern art.

Aghion rejected the stiff formality of 1950s fashion and created soft, feminine, body-conscious clothes from fine fabrics, calling them "luxury prêt-à-porter". Unique for their time, they were beautifully made clothes available off the rack. She set up her workshop in a maid's room above her large flat. In 1953, Aghion joined forces with Jacques Lenoir – he ran the business side and she ran the creative side. The duo put on the first Chloé show in 1956 at a breakfast at the Café de Flore, an important place for young intellectual Parisians in the 1940s and 1950s.

Aghion said: "Everything was yet to be invented, and this thrilled me." She hired Karl Lagerfeld early in his career, along with other emerging fashion designers. Her son, Philippe, recalls Lagerfeld coming to the company in the mid-1960s: "When he arrived from [the house of] Jean Patou, Karl was a shy individual. He and my mother made a fantastic team. He came into the spirit of Chloé."

Gaby Aghion continued to run Chloé until 1985, when it was bought by Dunhill Holdings (now Compagnie Financière Richemont Group). She died in Paris on 27 September 2014.

Awards
 French Legion of Honor (2013)

References 

www.linkedin.com/in/maghion

External links 
Chloé website
Chloe by Helene Schoumann (published by Assouline, 2003).
Gaby Aghion and Karl Lagerfeld revisit the past at an exhibition on the history of the Chloé label in Paris.  The New York Times, 17 October 2012 

1921 births
2014 deaths
French fashion designers
French women fashion designers
Recipients of the Legion of Honour
Artists from Alexandria
Businesspeople from Paris
Egyptian emigrants to France
Egyptian Jews
Jewish fashion designers